Leaze stone circle is a stone circle located in the parish of St. Breward on Bodmin Moor in Cornwall, UK.

Description
The circle stands in enclosed pasture near the buildings of Leaze farm and is composed of sixteen stones, six of which have fallen. It is approximately twenty four metres in diameter and is cut through the centre by a hedge. It has been estimated the circle once comprised twenty two stones. There is one stone positioned outside of the circle along with three dips suggested to have been formed by removed stones. Rough Tor, Tolborough Tor and Catshole Tor can be seen from the site with Brown Willy obscured behind Garrow Tor.

The fragmentary remains of two other stone circles (Emblance Downs stone circles) can be found about 300 metres northwest of Leaze stone circle. Less than 1 kilometre in a west by north-west direction lies the enigmatic enclosure known as King Arthur's Hall.

Alignments
Alexander Thom proposed a definitely indicated, site to stone, solar alignment at the site.

References

External links

 Pastscape - Leaze stone circle
 Illustrated entry in the Megalithic Portal
 Illustrated entry in the Modern Antiquarian
 

Bodmin Moor
Stone circles in Cornwall